Algeria has competed at every edition of the African Games. Its athletes have won a total of 879 medals.

Medal tables

Medals by Games

Below is a table representing all Algerian medals around the Games. Till now, Algeria has won a total of 879 medals, including 258 gold medals.

Medals by sport

Athletes with most medals 

Note: The athletes highlighted in khaki are still active.

See also 
 Algeria at the Islamic Solidarity Games
 Algeria at the Mediterranean Games
 Algeria at the Olympics
 Algeria at the Pan Arab Games
 Algeria at the Paralympics
 Sports in Algeria

References

External links 
 Algeria results at the All-Africa Games - Algerian Olympic Committee official website
 All-Africa Games index - todor66.com